Sri Tirupati Venkateswara Kalyanam is a 1979 Indian Telugu-language Hindu mythological film, based on Lord Venkateswara Avatar at Tirumala,  produced and directed by N. T. Rama Rao under his Ramakrishna Cine Studios banner. It stars N. T. Rama Rao, Jaya Prada, Jayasudha, Nandamuri Balakrishna  and music composed by Pendyala Nageswara Rao.

Plot
The film begins with the advent of Kali Yuga when depraved forces enact. So, Goddess Bhudevi (Sangeetha) issue a request to Lord Vishnu (N. T. Rama Rao) through Narada (Nandamuri Balakrishna) to keep his foot on her, for which Goddess Lakshmi (Jayasudha) censure. At the same time, Saptharishis helmed by Kasyapa Muni perform a Yagna where Narada arrives and questions who is the patron deity of the sacrifice. As they are not in a position to answer, the sages bequeath the responsibility to Bhrigu Maharshi (Dhulipala) who moves to test Trimurthi. After cursing Lord Siva and Brahma Bhrigu reaches Vaikunta, where he is turned a deaf ear. Enraged Bhrigu kicks Vishnu on his chest. To pacify him, Vishnu held his legs and pressed the extra eye on his foot the symbol of his egotism where the sage realized his folly and express regrets. But fuming Goddess Lakshmi (Jayasudha) quits Vaikunta, Vishnu backs her and keeps his first step on the earth at Tirumala hills, then she trembles. Thereafter, Vishnu reaches his ardent devotee Vakulamatha's (Anjali Devi) ashram whom he calls a mother, and she names him Srinivasa.

At one time, Srinivasa chases a wild elephant. In pursuit, he meets a charming girl Padmavati (Jayaprada), daughter of Aakasa Raju (Mikkilineni) and they fall in love. After initial hesitation, Aakasa Raju agrees to their knitting for which Srinivasa debts from Kubera and promises to repay only the interest till the end of Kali Yuga. Soon after the nuptial, Narada notifies the happening to Lakshmi when she confronts Vishnu. The clash between his two consorts leads Srinivasa, to turn himself into a stone. Depressed, Padmavathi also takes the stone form and Vakula Devi as a garland. Now Lakshmi shows her repentance and wants to reach the deity with a holy heart. So, she takes incarnation in a lotus flower and is reared by a Muslim King as Bibi Nanchari becomes a fine devotee of Lord Venkateswara. The act is condemned by Muslim Priests and they decree Chief Commander Uggla Khan (Satyanarayana) to bar her and she is seized. At present, the Lord appears and replaces her in his heart.

Generations pass, Once a devotee Bhavaji (Gummadi), arrives from North India and renames the Lord as Balaji. Anyhow, he is forbidden into the temple. There onwards, every night the god spends some time with him by playing dice. One day, Balaji loses his ornament in the bet, and Bhavaji is presented as guilty for the deed. Right now, the King conducts a test on Bhavaji by prisoning him full of sugar cane which he has to finish before dawn. During that plight, Lord Venkateswara appears in the form of an elephant and vanishes the sugar cane which makes everyone startled. Since then, he is renowned as Hathiram Bhavaji and the temple authority endorsed him. Finally, the movie ends with Hathiram Bhavaji praising the deity with Suprabhatam.

Cast

N. T. Rama Rao as Lord Venkateswara
Jayasudha as Goddess Lakshmi
Jayaprada as Goddess Padmavathi
Sangeetha as Goddess Bhudevi
Nandamuri Balakrishna as Narada Maharshi
Satyanarayana as Ugla Khan
Gummadi as Hathiram Bhavaji 
Mukkamala as Muslim Priest
Mikkilineni as Aakasa Raju
Dhulipala as Bhrigu Maharshi
Allu Ramalingaiyah as Gopanna
P. J. Sarma 
Chalapathi Rao
Anjali Devi as Vakula Devi  
Jayachitra as Yerukalasani
Rama Prabha as Gowri
Pushpalatha
Manju Bhargavi as Goddess Parvathi

Soundtrack

Music composed by Pendyala Nageswara Rao. Music released on EMI Columbia Audio Company.

References

External links 
 

1979 films
Hindu mythological films
Films scored by Pendyala Nageswara Rao
1970s Telugu-language films
Films directed by N. T. Rama Rao